Sweat is a 2002 French action film directed by Louis-Pascal Couvelaire.

Cast 
 Jean-Hugues Anglade - Harvey
 Joaquim de Almeida - Noh
 Cyrille Thouvenin - Victor
 Sagamore Stévenin - Simon
  - Farah

References

External links 

2002 action films
2002 films
French action films
2000s French films
2000s French-language films